Chapet is a commune in the Yvelines department in the Île-de-France region in north-central France, about 16 km east of Mantes-la-Jolie. It is on the Normandy motorway (A13).

The commune's neighbours are Verneuil-sur-Seine to the northeast, to the east is Vernouillet, with Morainvilliers to the southeast, Ecquevilly to the southwest,  and to the northwest is Les Mureaux.

It is a largely rural and agricultural community; the land is divided mainly between arable crops (cereals, oilseed rape) with some woods and forest.

The parish church of Saint-Denis dates from the 12th century. The bell-tower was added in 1859.

See also
Communes of the Yvelines department

References

Communes of Yvelines